Anthony Purpura (born November 11, 1986, in Lawrence, Massachusetts) is a professional American rugby union player who plays prop for the USA Eagles XV side. He currently plays for the New England Free Jacks in Major League Rugby (MLR). 

Purpura had a successful club career for top level teams such as Old Blue R.F.C., Boston Rugby Club and Mystic River Rugby Club.

Other Club affiliations include University of Maine and Mid Canterbury Rugby Football Union and as assistant coach at Harvard University.

Club rugby career
Purpura was introduced to the sport of rugby by a roommate while in school at Avon Old Farms, where he was a member of the football team and standout All-Star wrestler. In 2005 he entered the University of Maine as a recruit for the football team, but give it up the sport to join the  U. Maine rugby club.  Between 2005 and 2009 Purpura served as co captain and president of the club and helped the Black Bears to perhaps one of their best seasons, finishing the fall ranked 7th in the country. Throughout his four-year career at Maine, Purpura led the team to a 17-2-1 record.

While still in college, Purpura first transitioned to the next level of rugby with Division 1 Mystic River alongside former Eagle front rower Jake Sprague.  In 2007 he made the jump to Boston RFC, then part of the Rugby Super League.  After nearly a decade with Boston, Purpura had a short stint with Old Blue.

San Diego Legion
In March 2018, Purpura signed with the San Diego Legion of Major League Rugby.

New England Free Jacks
Purpura signed with the New England Free Jacks in 2019.

USA Rugby career
Purpura was selected to tour with the USA Eagles squad for the Autumn 2010 tour of Europe and made his international debut in June 2010 was against Russia.

After a nearly seven-year hiatus, Purpura was again named to the Eagles roster as a starter against Uruguay on 4 February 2017.  Two weeks later, he again earned a starting position in the front row and scored his first test match try in the USA's 51–34 victory y Canada on 18 February in Round 3 of the 2017 Americas Rugby Championship.

References

External links
 Player Profile eaglesxv.com
 Player Profile USA Rugby

1986 births
Living people
American rugby union players
United States international rugby union players
San Diego Legion players
New England Free Jacks players
Mystic River Rugby players
Boston RFC players
Rugby union props
Avon Old Farms alumni